Judgement Records is a record label, started by Joe Nicolo after Ruffhouse Records was dissolved.

Kris Kross followed Nicolo to his new label.  Artists also included Ced, The Co-Defendants, and GOAT.  Joe became “Joe the Butcher” around 1982 when editing tape for the late producer Ray Monahan, who said: “You need a nickname. The way you chop up tape, let’s call you ‘Joe the Butcher.’”

Joe said, “Perfect, because my father literally was ‘Joe the butcher.’” In fact, since Studio 4 moved to suburban Conshohocken in 1994, it has been located across the street from what was Joe Sr.’s butcher shop for 35 years.

Joe and Schoolly D-manager Chris Schwartz started Ruffhouse Records in 1986 to capitalize on the wealth of rap talent from the Philly area. In the late '80s Joe produced, engineered or mixed (for other labels) Schoolly, the 7A3, Steady B, Blackmale, Roxanne Shante and many others, establishing his rap rep.

After foundering under an onerous distribution deal with Enigma Records in 1987 and 1988, Ruffhouse came to fruition when distribution was switched to Columbia. The label's first release was Cheba's The Piper in 1990, and their first hit was Tim Dog's Fuck Compton (with Joe mixing) which topped the rap charts in 1991 and fueled the East/West rap wars.

The label came into its own with the release of the first Cypress Hill album, a double-platinum slice of THC-soaked L.A. Latino rap, exec-produced and mixed by Joe.  One of Ruffhouse's biggest hits came in 1992 with Kris Kross, a pair of Atlanta 12-year-olds under the wing of Jermaine Dupri (with Joe and Phil engineering and mixing, and Joe exec-producing), released the quadruple-platinum Totally Krossed Out (No. 1).

The label's other commercial and critical cow has been the Fugees, whose The Score went 7 X's-platinum in 1996; solo releases from Fugees Wyclef Jean, Lauryn Hill (6 Million), and Pras have all succeeded as well.  Ruffhouse Records went on to sell over 100 million records worldwide.  Joe has 9 Grammy wins and in April 2003 was given the Hero's Award from the Grammy organization.

Joe has since gone on to moviemaking and now has several films under his belt including Shade starring Sly Stallone and Jamie Foxx, and One Part Sugar starring Danny DeVito.

See also
 List of record labels

American record labels